Guitar Boogie is a blues rock compilation album featuring Eric Clapton, Jeff Beck and Jimmy Page together with the Allstars and members of The Rolling Stones.

The album was released in the US in 1971 by RCA Records; in the mid 1970s, Pickwick Records leased the rights to reissue several recordings in the RCA catalog and Guitar Boogie was briefly re-issued on the  Pickwick label in 1977;  RCA soon reclaimed the rights to its Pickwick-leased recordings and reissued the album in 1980. The album was compiled by Richard Robinson and originally included a piece by rock critic Richard Meltzer on the back cover. The tracks were collected from Immediate Records' 1968 series of compilation albums Blues Anytime, which were released in the US as An Anthology of British Blues and later under the title British Archives Series: Blues for Collectors.

Most songs on this album were written by Eric Clapton, Jeff Beck or Jimmy Page, and of the three guitarists, only Jimmy Page appears on every track, though not always in a lead role. Clapton was not present for the tracks featuring Jeff Beck, which were recorded with members of Cyril Davies' band the Allstars. Likewise, Beck was not at the session with Clapton, the tracks from which were later overdubbed by Ian Stewart, Mick Jagger, Bill Wyman and Charlie Watts of the Rolling Stones.

Track listing
Side A

Side B

1973 German release
Side A

Side B

References

Jeff Beck albums
Jimmy Page albums
Eric Clapton compilation albums
1971 compilation albums
RCA Records compilation albums